On 3 June 1966, a newly built Hawker Siddeley Trident jetliner crashed during a pre-delivery test flight near the village of Felthorpe, Norfolk, England, killing all four crew.  The aeroplane had entered a deep stall from which the crew were unable to recover.  It was the first loss of a Trident aircraft.

Aircraft
The aircraft involved was a tri-jet Hawker Siddeley Trident 1C, registration  serial number 2126; that was about to be delivered to British European Airways.

Accident flight

The aircraft was making its first flight, which was a routine test flight to enable the aircraft's Certificate of Airworthiness to be issued. There were four crew on board. The aircraft took off from Hatfield Aerodrome at 16:52. The crew then disconnected the stall warning systems in order to ascertain the actual margin left after the warning had been given before the aircraft stalled. On this particular flight, the aircraft was being operated with its centre of gravity towards its aft limit.

Shortly after 18:30, the pilot reported that the aircraft was in a "superstall". At the time, the aircraft was observed to be configured for landing. The nose was seen to pitch up by 30 to 40° before the aircraft turned to port, followed by the starboard wing dropping. Although full power was applied, the aircraft entered into a flat spin, and crashed at Felthorpe, killing all on board. It was not fitted with an anti-spin parachute. The site of the accident was in a field adjacent to Felthorpe Airfield.

Crew
The crew were pilots Peter Barlow and George Errington, and technicians E. Brackstone-Brown and G.W. Patterson.

Investigation
The Accidents Investigation Branch opened an inquiry into the accident. The investigation found that accident was the result of the pilot delaying recovery manoeuvres for too long, thereby allowing the aircraft to enter a deep stall from which it was impossible to recover.

See also
1963 BAC One-Eleven test crash
British European Airways Flight 548

References

Sources

Deep Stall Disaster Flight International, 20 November 1968 p909-910

Aviation accidents and incidents in 1966
1966 in England
Aviation accidents and incidents in Norfolk
Accidents and incidents involving the Hawker Siddeley Trident
20th century in Norfolk
June 1966 events in the United Kingdom
1966 disasters in the United Kingdom
Airliner accidents and incidents caused by stalls